Ventôse (also Ventose) was the sixth month in the French Republican Calendar. The month was named after the Latin word ventosus, which means windy.

Ventôse was the third month of the winter quarter (mois d'hiver). It started between 19 and 21 February. It ended between 20 and 21 March. It follows the Pluviôse and precedes the Germinal.

New names for the calendar were suggested by Fabre d'Églantine on 24 October 1793 and on 24 November the National Convention accepted the names with minor changes. It was decided to omit the circumflex (accent circonflexe) in the names of the winter months, so the month was named Ventose instead of Ventôse. Historiography still prefers the spelling Ventôse.

Day name table 

Like all FRC months Ventôse lasted 30 days and was divided into three 10-day weeks called décades (decades). Every day had the name of an agricultural plant, except the 5th (Quintidi) and 10th day (Decadi) of every decade, which had the name of a domestic animal (Quintidi) or an agricultural tool (Decadi).

Conversion table

External links 
Winter Quarter of Year II (facsimile)

French Republican calendar
February
March

sv:Franska revolutionskalendern#Månaderna